The PEN/Joyce Osterweil Award for Poetry was awarded by PEN America in odd-numbered years in recognition of a book of poetry with "high literary character" by a new and emerging American poet of any age with "the promise of further literary achievement."

Description
The PEN American Center awards have been characterized as being among the "major" American literary prizes. From 1999 to June 1, 2020, the PEN/Joyce Osterweil Award for Poetry was awarded by PEN America (formerly PEN American Center) in odd-numbered years in recognition of a book of poetry with "high literary character" by a new and emerging American poet of any age with "the promise of further literary achievement." The winner received $5,000. The award was one of many PEN awards sponsored by International PEN affiliates in over 145 PEN centres around the world. It was replaced with an annual PEN/Voelcker Award for Poetry Collection.

Award winners

References

External links
 PEN/Joyce Osterweil Award for Poetry

PEN America awards
Awards established in 1999
1999 establishments in the United States
American poetry awards